Mattias Gestranius (born 7 June 1978) is a Finnish professional football referee. He has been a full international for FIFA since 2011. He is a laboratory technician.

References

External links 
 

1978 births
Living people
Finnish football referees
People from Pargas
Sportspeople from Southwest Finland